Langsdorffia are a genus of flowering plants in the family Balanophoraceae, native to Central America, South America, Madagascar and New Guinea. They are parasites on the roots of other plants, with no chlorophyll or stomata of their own.

Species
Currently accepted species include:
Langsdorffia heterotepala L.J.T.Cardoso, R.J.V.Alves & J.M.A.Braga
Langsdorffia hypogaea Mart.
Langsdorffia malagasica (Fawc.) B.Hansen
Langsdorffia papuana R.Geesink

References

Balanophoraceae
Santalales genera